is an original video animation based in the works of Go Nagai. Following the same concept, a oneshot manga by Nagai was released in 1992.

The OVA was also released in Italy under the name Il pazzo mondo di Go Nagai.

Plot
As Akira Fudo wakes up, he finds himself in a "chibi" form, which he thinks doesn't fit a hero such as himself. He is not the only one that has changed. Together with Ryo and Miki, they set out on a journey to restore their proper appearances and find out what caused this change. During their adventure they find several other characters from the world of Go Nagai, such as Mazinger Z, Dr. Hell, Baron Ashura, and others.

Characters

Devilman
Akira Fudo/Devilman (played by Shō Hayami)
Ryo Asuka/Satan (Ryo played by Yū Mizushima, Satan played by Sakiko Tamagawa)
Miki Makimura (played by Jun koyamaki)
Jinmen (played by Takeshi Aono)
Sirène (played by Yoshiko Sakakibara)
Psycho Genie
Kaim
Agwel
Gelmer

Mazinger Z
Koji Kabuto (played by Kappei Yamaguchi)
Sayaka Yumi (played by Ikue Ōtani)
Baron Ashura (male part played by Kōichi Yamadera, female part played by Saeko Shimazu)
Dr. Hell (played by Kōsei Tomita)
Gamia Q3 (played by Megumi Hayashibara)
Count Brocken
Garada K7
Belgas V5

Other series
Grendizer
Steel Jeeg
Getter Robo
Violence Jack (played by Unshō Ishizuka)
Several other characters from other series created by Nagai also appear in both the opening and ending of the episodes, although they do not have a role in the main story.

Production

Staff
Distributor: Bandai Visual
Planning: Dynamic Planning
Original work: Go Nagai
Director/storyboards: Umanosuke Iida
Animation director: Tsutomu Yabuki
Character design/key animation director: Kazuo Komatsubara
Art director: Yoshinari Kanehako
Director of photography: Naoto Fujikura
Sound director: Shigeru Chiba
Music: Kenji Kawai
Production: Dynamic Planning, Triangle Staff
Executive producer: Bandai
Source(s)

Theme songs
Opening: . Lyrics by Kan-chan, composition by Kenji Kawai, song by Shinichi Ishihara.
Ending: Pending Now! Lyrics by Kan-chan, composition by Kenji Kawai, song by Kyoko Hirotani.

Media

Episodes

Home video
Besides the original VHS releases, all episodes were released in laserdisc also by Bandai.

In  was released the CB Chara Nagai Go World Remaster Box by Bandai Visual (standard number BCBA-2916), a DVD box containing the episodes plus other extras.

Releases outside Japan
The OVA was released in Italy in VHS format by Dynamic Italia in 2000, and on 3 DVD by Yamato Video in 2013.

Photobooks
As part of the collection , published by Keibunsha, three photobooks based on the three episodes were released in 1991.

Manga

References

External links

CB Chara Nagai Go World at The World of Go Nagai webpage 
CB Chara Nagai Go World at allcinema 

1991 anime OVAs
1992 manga
Comedy anime and manga
Go Nagai
Devilman
Discotek Media